Croceibacterium  is a genus of Gram-negative bacteria.

References 

Sphingomonadales
Bacteria genera